The 2011 Kerry Senior Football Championship was the 111th staging of the Kerry Senior Football Championship since its establishment by the Kerry County Board in 1889. The draw for the opening round fixtures took place on 9 April 2011. The championship ran from 10 June to 30 October 2011.

Dr. Crokes entered the championship as the defending champions.

The final was played on 30 October 2011 at FitzGerald Stadium in Killarney, between Dr. Crokes and Mid Kerry in what was their first ever meeting in the final. Dr. Crokes won the match by 2-08 to 0-09 to claim their eighth championship title overall and a second title in succession.

Dingle's David Geaney was the championship's top scorer with 1-23.

Team changes

To Championship

Promoted from the Kerry Intermediate Football Championship
 Gneeveguilla

From Championship

Relegated to the Kerry Intermediate Football Championship
 Spa

Results

Round 1

Round 2

Round 3

 Rathmore received a bye in this round.

Relegation playoffs

Quarter-finals

Semi-finals

Final

Championship statistics

Top scorers

Overall

In a single game

Miscellaneous
 Gneeveguilla make their first appearance as a single club at senior level since 1994.

References

Kerry Senior Football Championship
2011 in Gaelic football